The Czech military ranks are the military insignia used by the Army of the Czech Republic. The Czech Republic is a landlocked country, and does not possess a navy.

Commissioned officer ranks
The rank insignia of commissioned officers.

Other ranks
The rank insignia of non-commissioned officers and enlisted personnel.

See also
 Ranks of the Czechoslovak Armed Forces

References

External links
 

Czech Republic
Military of the Czech Republic